"Kelvin Kent" was a pseudonym shared by writers Henry Kuttner and Arthur K. Barnes. The byline appeared on a series of 12 science fiction stories published in Thrilling Wonder Stories from 1939 to 1944, featuring protagonist "Pete Manx". Leigh Brackett noted that the stories were inspired by Edmond Hamilton's 1938 TWS story "Easy Money". Comics Journal essayist Donald Phelps described Manx as "a lumpen prole Broadwayite . . . A grubby, pragmatic Damon Runyonite [who] (sometimes reluctantly) embarked on time-traveling errands: these, at the behest of his scientist-buddy, inauspiciously named 'Dr. Mayhem'". Six stories in the series are ascribed to Kuttner, four to Barnes, and two are reportedly collaborations.

Bibliography

Omnibus

Haffner Press has announced an omnibus edition of the Kutter/Barnes collaborations and shared character stories, set for release in November 2015. Hollywood on the Moon / Man About Time: The Pete Manx Adventures will include all twelve Kelvin Kent stories, as well as six "Hollywood on the Moon" stories, which were originally published under Barnes's and/or Kuttner's names.

References

External links
 

American science fiction writers
20th-century pseudonymous writers
Collective pseudonyms